Lori McNeil was the defending champion but lost in the second round to Laura Gildemeister.

Zina Garrison won in the final 6–0, 6–1 against Pam Shriver.

Seeds
A champion seed is indicated in bold text while text in italics indicates the round in which that seed was eliminated.

  Zina Garrison (champion)
  Pam Shriver (final)
  Lori McNeil (second round)
  Patty Fendick (first round)
  Amy Frazier (first round)
  Rosalyn Fairbank (semifinals)
  Gretchen Magers (second round)
  Gigi Fernández (semifinals)

Draw

External links
 1989 Virginia Slims of Newport Draw

Virginia Slims of Newport
1989 WTA Tour
1989 Hall of Fame Tennis Championships